Leonov (masculine) or Leonova (feminine) is a Russian surname. Notable people with the surname include:

Aleksandra Leonova (born 1964), Russian women's basketball player
Aleksandr Leonov (born 1978), Russian boxer
Alena Leonova (born 1990), Russian figure skater
Alexei Leonov (1934–2019), Russian/Soviet cosmonaut; the first person to walk in space
Elena Leonova (born 1973), Russian Soviet pair skater
Leonid Leonov, prominent Soviet novelist
Nikolai Leonov, Soviet KGB officer
Sergey Leonov (born 1983), Russian politician
Viktor Leonov (1916–2003), Soviet Sailor and two time Hero of the Soviet Union
Yevgeny Leonov, popular Soviet actor
Ihor Leonov, Ukrainian footballer, defender, known for playing with Shakhtar Donetsk

See also
Leonov (fictional spacecraft) in the novel 2010: Odyssey Two

Russian-language surnames